is a Japanese light novel series written by Takehaya and illustrated by Poco. HJ Bunko has published forty-one volumes since 2009 under their HJ Bunko imprint, as well as two side story volumes. A manga adaptation with art by Tomosane Ariike is serialized in Hobby Japan's online seinen manga magazine Comic Dangan. A 12-episode anime television series adaptation by Silver Link aired between July 11 and September 26, 2014.

Plot
Kōtarō Satomi decided to live on his own when he began high school, and chose Room 106 of Corona House because it was cheap. Unfortunately, Kōtarō soon discovers that numerous otherworldly and supernatural girls also want his room for various reasons of their own, and aren't about to back down. As a result, Kōtarō and the girls find themselves forced to live together as they try to settle just who ends up with the room.

Characters

Main characters

A high school boy who moves into Room 106 and intends to keep it at all costs due to its unexpectedly cheap 5,000 yen per month rent. After an accident in the archaeology site he works at, he gains the ability to see ghosts and wield ancient artifacts. He usually is seen wearing the replica of the Blue Knight’s armor Theia has when fighting, along with using his two swords, Saguratin and later (after Volume 7) Signaltin. While at first not that experienced in sword fighting, he gains a much higher level of skill after he returned from Ancient Forthorthe in the past with Clan (Clariossa Daora Forthorthe) due to all the fighting he did there (explained in Volume 7.5 and 8.5)

A female ghost who already haunts Room 106. She wants to expel Kōtarō and claim the room as her own. She is able to manipulate solid items and launch them to attack, but her attack is neutralized when near sacred objects. Later, it is revealed that she is actually a soul who has left her body, and the Room 106 residents work together to restore her. She eventually gains her real body back, but still has high levels of spiritual energy as well as having the ability of Astral Projection, that is, to leave her body and project her ghost form at her leisure.

A clumsy and timorous but dutiful magical girl who intends to occupy the room, which contains high levels of magical power, with the intention of defending it from other magical girls who may use such power for evil. She constantly summons magical force fields whenever room 106 residents start engaging each other. Because this often occurs behind the scenes, the other residents of Room 106 refuse to believe that she is a magical girl, instead considering her a mere schoolgirl who loves cosplay and has developed for herself an elaborate backstory.

A startlingly buxom descendant of the Earth People, who moved underground during centuries past, and a member of the Kurano clan, a family of oracles and spellmasters. Miss Kurano claims that she needs to rebuild a shrine on this room's location and use the etheric energy gathered by it to generate weapons and launch an invasion against the people on the surface: against Kōtarō's own civilization. It is later revealed that the Kurano clan in fact wants to make peace, and Kiriha is actually doing her best to delay the invasion. She eventually succeeded, as the Kurano clan restored its political power before the invasion can actually take place.

While her full name is Theiamillis Gre Mastir Sagurada von Forthorthe, her name is often shortened to Theia. Her unfortunate nickname from Kōtarō is 'Tulip', from her appearance when her lengthy skirt had been swept up over her head. Tulip is an intergalactic alien princess from a planet named Fortorthe and she has a large spacecraft intimidatingly armed with pulse lasers and cannons. Theia is given the task of conquering a spot in intergalactic space in order to prove her worthiness as a successor to the throne. For the first time ever the random spot chosen by the computer was on an inhabited planet, namely Room 106. This means she also must procure the fealty of the inhabitants, i.e Kōtarō. The princess, it turns out, is fond since childhood of a Fortorthe legend known as the Blue Knight, and has named her spaceship and battle armor after him. She later grants the armor to Kōtarō, along with her personal sword, Saguratin.

Theia's maidservant and wise counselor, often giving useful advice to her mistress. When the competitors for Room 106 were on a group vacation, an incident occurred where a sleeping Kōtarō holds tightly to Ruth, who lies next to him. Ruth initially was flustered nearly to a panic at what she mistook to be the boy's supposed romantic intentions; however, when she realizes that he has been dreaming and mistaken her for a rare rhinoceros beetle, she flies into a rage whenever she sees a beetle. Ruth wishes for nothing more than the happiness of her childhood friend Princess Theia, and she is often seen supporting her in any way possible, while remaining the most conciliatory and level-headed of the supposed competitors.

Coming from a wealthy family, she is the kind and well-mannered president of the school knitting club and is the only other member besides Kōtarō. Her easy closeness with him is a constant source of jealousy for the girls who are actually living with him, no less because she has feelings for Kōtarō.

Landlady of the Corona House (home of Room 106), qi-using master martial artist, and a high school girl as well. Shizuka is the current host of the Fire Dragon Emperor Alunaya. When his power leaks out, it strengthens Shizuka's already strong body. This is the reason why she was able to overpower all of the invaders the day they met despite their own powers. Even without using Alunaya powers, Shizuka's martial arts skills puts her in the same league as the invader girls. She accepts the need of the Room 106 residents to compete over it, but forces them to keep the competition peaceful and normal. Shizuka is friendly, respectful, and easy to get along with. She is strongly protective of her family's apartment since both of her parents are dead. Along with taking great care of it, she will become enraged whenever it is damaged; thus, it is she who has drawn up the convention and rules by which all competitors for the room must peaceably abide.

The  is a band of knights created by Kōtarō Satomi serving under princess Theiamillis Gre Forthorthe.

Satomi Knights member uniforms were designed somewhat resembling of Kōtarō's armor, but the design in its entirety is closer to a school uniform. The colors were blue and white, based on the Blue Knight and Alaia, and then each person's personal color was added in.

Often called Clan, Clariossa Daora Forthorthe is the Second Princess of the Forthorthe Royal family. As such, she is a constant rival and enemy to Theia, even more so given the fact that their families, the Mastir (Theia) and Schweiger (Clan) never got along well in the first place. Originally appearing as an enemy intending to get rid of Theia so as to make her fail her task, but after the events that took place in the past in Forthorthe with Kōtarō (after Volume 7, with the story being explained in Volume 7.5 and 8.5), she becomes quite close with the boy resident of Room 106 and she decides rather to make him her vassal, and starts to care less about the throne. From then on, rather than resorting to underhanded tactics, she decides to fight Theia fair and square for the rights to Throne, while in reality caring much more about simply having and making Kōtarō her vassal.
She is not only very intelligent, but also a very creative scientist, having invented herself most of the equipment and weapons she uses.

A magical girl part of the organization called Darkness Rainbow, she is an enemy of Yurika, as the two organizations Darkness Rainbow and Rainbow Heart are enemies of each other. Appearing as an enemy, and being the main villain of Volume 5, she later on becomes very friendly with Kōtarō after he saved her life (Volume 8). From then on, she sees Kōtarō not as an enemy, but as a close friend who she does not wish to harm. While still part of Darkness Rainbow, eventually she decides to leave them and live on simply as Aika Maki, and not a member of Darkness Rainbow (Volume 12).

Supporting characters

One of Kiriha's battle drones.

Another of Kiriha's battle drones.

Kōtarō's friend and classmate who works at the same archaeology site as him.

Media

Light novels
The first light novel volume was published on March 1, 2009, by Hobby Japan under their HJ Bunko imprint. As of September 2022, 41 volumes have been published, as well as two side story volumes. Online publisher J-Novel Club have licensed the light novel for an English release. The company planned to release the first 31 volumes of the series (including volumes 7.5 and 8.5) as omnibus paperbacks in 2020. The Kickstarter campaign to do so was successfully funded in only six hours.

Manga
A manga adaptation began serialization on December 20, 2013, in Comic Dangan. The series ended on February 16, 2017. The first volume was published by Hobby Japan on July 24, 2014, and the fifth and last on April 27, 2017.

|}

Anime
A short promotional trailer to advertise the light novels was released in 2010, with animation by Silver Link and directed by Shinichi Watanabe.

A 12-episode anime television series adaptation by Silver Link and directed by Shin Oonuma aired between July 11 and September 26, 2014. The anime has been licensed by Sentai Filmworks. MVM Films has licensed the Series in the UK.

Episode list

Notes

References

External links
Official website 
Anime official website 

2009 Japanese novels
Anime and manga based on light novels
Harem anime and manga
HJ Bunko
Hobby Japan manga
J-Novel Club books
Japanese webcomics
Light novels
Seinen manga
Sentai Filmworks
Silver Link